St Edward's College, Malta is a Maltese private boys' independent school, with optional boarding, in Cottonera.
Its enrollment is just under 700 pupils of 5–18 years of age. It was founded in 1929 by Baroness Strickland, Countess della Catena, who gave a private donation to establish it. It was built on the grounds of what was once a Knights of Malta fort; the rear end of the school is still surrounded by the fort's bastion walls. The school was modelled on the ideas and ideals of British public schools, initially to educate the boys of the Maltese aristocracy and the boys of Malta-based British military officers.

Background history 

The Governor of Malta, Sir John Philip Du Cane, obtained the buildings of what was once the Cottonera Military Hospital in Vittoriosa, along with the parade ground adjoining to St. Clement's bastions built by the Knights of Malta.  The perimeter of the western side of the site formed part of the Cottonera lines, a fortified wall built by the Knights of St John. The extensive grounds between the bastion walls and the old hospital buildings would serve as ideal recreational areas and would also give the college enough space for expansion when needed.

Thus, with an ideal site secured and the necessary financial backing guaranteed, a small group of men, among them senior notable members of the Maltese nobility, gathered in the Governor's Palace in Valletta on 18 January 1929 to sign a foundation deed of trust. The following October the school opened its gates to twenty-nine foundation pupils.

The numbers of pupils during the college's first years would remain considerably low due to the relatively high fees which were necessary to keep the college running. The British Council's timely financial backing made it possible for the college to lower fees for local pupils. As a result, the population grew steadily with an increasing number of Maltese gentry sending their boys to the school.

In the mid-1930s, an old ammunitions depot built by the Knights of St John was converted into the college's chapel. Physics and chemistry laboratories and additional dormitories were also developed at this time.

By the late 1930s, it became apparent that the buildings could not be altered or modified further and the construction of a new wing was proposed. However, with the advent of World War II, these plans had to be shelved since the college's perilously close proximity to Malta's main harbours necessitated a temporary relocation to the old seminary in Mdina for the duration of the war.

The building of the new classrooms (the middle school block) occurred after the boys and college masters moved back to Cottonera in 1946. With the new classrooms completed, few other structural changes were made for nearly two decades, at which point the need for modern science facilities became a pressing issue. A successful fundraising campaign resulted in the laying of the foundation stone of the new block in 1967 by Sir Maurice Dorman, the last British Governor-General of Malta. With a donation made by the trustees of the British Boys Schools of Alexandria and the Victoria College, Alexandria Foundation, the much-needed Assembly Hall in the new block became a reality. 

In the 1970s, the block that used to house the married teachers was converted into the junior school, which also included an infant's section. Due to the college's growing popularity, the junior school received a structural revamping and extension in 1994. Classrooms were enlarged and the designs (by Old Edwardian Richard England) also ensured that the junior school building now had their own drama and music hall as well as an IT room.

Houses 
The school has three houses named after three Governors-General of Malta: Ducane House Sir John Du Cane (Green), Campbell House Sir David Campbell (Red) and Congreve House Sir Walter Congreve (Blue).

Alumni 
Among the many famous alumni of the school is Cambridge University professor Edward De Bono, known for his ideas on lateral thinking. Other well known alumni include architect Richard England, former Lord Chief Justice of England and Wales, Igor Judge, Baron Judge, former President of Malta Ugo Mifsud Bonnici, Chief Justice Emeritus Giuseppe Mifsud Bonnici, Archbishop of Malta Charles Scicluna. Footballers Andrew Hogg and Matthew Guillaumier also Explorer Justin Packshaw attended the college.

Since its foundation in 1929, the school had produced many who went on to serve in the British military and the Colonial Service in Egypt, Palestine and the Sudan. The school has an old-boys' association known as the Old Edwardian Association (OEA).

Past headmasters 

 1929 – 1945 F Kerr McClement
 1945 – 1952 H.B.L. Hughes
 1952 – 1955 Gerald Carey (acting headmaster)
 1955 – 1966 Rudesind Brookes
 1966 – 1972 Bernard Rickett
 1972 – 1974 Alan Dukes
 1974 – 1976 Thomas Glass
 1976 – 1989 Antoine Cachia Caruana
 1989 – 1997 Gerald Briscoe
 1997 – 2002 William Dimech
 2002 – 2007 Anthony Saliba
 2007 – 2012 Michael Chittenden
 2012 – 2015 George Psaila
 2015 – present Nollaig Mac an Bhaird

See also

 Education in Malta
 List of schools in Malta

References

Further reading

External links
 , the school's official website
 Anniversary of the end of the First World War in 1918: A history tour of St Edward’s College... by Anthony Zarb Dimech, Tuesday, 13 November 2018, The Malta Independent

1920s establishments in Malta
1929 establishments in the British Empire
Boys' schools in Europe
Buildings and structures in Birgu
Educational institutions established in 1929
Catholic boarding schools
Catholic elementary and primary schools in Europe
Catholic schools in Malta
Sixth form colleges in Malta